Răzvan Trandu (born 17 March 1991) is a Romanian professional footballer who plays as a centre midfielder for Liga III side CSC Ghiroda.

Club career
Trandu made his Liga I debut playing for ACS Poli Timișoara on 19 July 2013 in a match against Dinamo București.

Personal life
Răzvan Trandu's father, Orlando was a referee, a football coach and a football player who played for UM Timișoara and Politehnica Timișoara and his grandfather Vasile was a footballer who played for UM Timișoara.

References

External links
 
 
 Răzvan Trandu at frf-ajf.ro

1991 births
Living people
Sportspeople from Timișoara
Romanian footballers
Association football midfielders
Liga I players
Liga II players
Liga III players
FC Politehnica Timișoara players
ACS Poli Timișoara players
FC Rapid București players